is a passenger railway station located in the town of Shin'onsen, Mikata District, Hyōgo, Japan, operated by West Japan Railway Company (JR West).

Lines

Station layout
The station consists of one ground-level side platform and one ground-level island platform connected by an underground passage. The station has a Midori no Madoguchi staffed ticket office.

Platforms

Adjacent stations

History
Hamasaka Station opened on November 10, 1911.

Passenger statistics
In fiscal 2016, the station was used by an average of 263 passengers daily

Surrounding area
 Shinonsen Town Hall (former Hamasaka Town Hall)
 Hamasaka Onsen

See also
List of railway stations in Japan

References

External links

 Station Official Site

Railway stations in Hyōgo Prefecture
Sanin Main Line
Railway stations in Japan opened in 1911
Shin'onsen, Hyōgo